Be My Slave is a 1983 album by the American heavy metal band Bitch, released on the Metal Blade Records label under the genre "dominatrix metal". Be My Slave was cited by Tipper Gore, during the Parents Music Resource Center campaign against violent and sexually explicit content in the music industry and was held as an example in the hearing before the United States Senate Committee on Commerce, Science and Transportation on September 19, 1985. The album was re-issued in 1989 on a single CD with the EP Damnation Alley.

Track listing

Personnel

Band members
Betsy Bitch - lead vocals
David Carruth - guitar
Mark Anthony Webb - bass
Robby Settles - drums

Production
Phil Pecora - producer
Bill Metoyer - engineer
Brian Slagel - executive producer

References

1983 debut albums
Metal Blade Records albums